Cuiping Subdistrict may refer to:

Cuiping Subdistrict, Dazhou, Sichuan, China
Cuiping Subdistrict, Qixia, Shandong, China

See also
Cuiping District, Yibin, Sichuan, China
Cuipingshan Subdistrict, Xuzhou, Jiangsu, China